4-Fluoropethidine is a drug that is a derivative of pethidine (meperidine), which combines pethidine's opioid analgesic effects with increased monoamine reuptake inhibition. It is around 50% less potent than pethidine as an opioid analgesic, but conversely is 50% more potent as a dopamine reuptake inhibitor, with other derivatives such as the 4-iodo and 3,4-dichloro analogues being even more potent dopamine reuptake inhibitors again. However none of these compounds substitute for cocaine or produce stimulant effects in animals, suggesting that they still act primarily as opioid analgesic drugs in practice.  Its action and degree of relation to pethidine means that it may be controlled in those countries which have laws about controlled-substance analogues; it is not itself listed in the Controlled Substances Act 1970.

See also
 Hydroxypethidine (Bemidone)
 Nocaine

References 

Synthetic opioids
4-Phenylpiperidines
Ethyl esters
Fluoroarenes
Mu-opioid receptor agonists
Dopamine reuptake inhibitors